
Year 59 BC was a year of the pre-Julian Roman calendar. At the time, it was known as the Year of the Consulship of Caesar and Bibulus (or, less frequently, year 695 Ab urbe condita). The denomination 59 BC for this year has been used since the early medieval period, when the Anno Domini calendar era became the prevalent method in Europe for naming years.

Events 
 By place 

 Roman Republic 
 Consuls: Gaius Julius Caesar and Marcus Calpurnius Bibulus (known in jest as "the consulship of Julius and Caesar" due to Bibulus' Social  withdrawal from public view to "consult the heavens" in an effort to invalidate Caesar's intended legislation).
 Caesar makes the Acta Diurna (Daily News), the world's first daily newspaper, public. The Acta contains details of official decrees and appointments; births, deaths, and marriages. Even sport results—the outcome of the gladiatorial contests and chariot races at the capital.
 The First Triumvirate: Caesar, Pompey and Crassus form an unofficial alliance (or 60 BC).
 Caesar marries Calpurnia, in Rome.
 The colonia of Florentia, modern Florence, founded.

Births 
 Artavasdes I, king of Media Atropatene (approximate date)
 Livy, Roman historian and writer (approximate date)
 Ptolemy XIV, king (pharaoh) of Egypt (or 60 BC)
 Livia, Roman empress as the second wife of Augustus

Deaths 
 Gaius Octavius, father of Caesar Augustus 
 He of Changyi, emperor of the Han Dynasty 
 Quintus Caecilius Metellus Celer, Roman consul
 Quintus Servilius Caepio, Roman tribune

References